Thyrosticta dujardini is a moth of the subfamily Arctiinae first described by Paul Griveaud in 1969. It is native to Madagascar.

This species has a wingspan of 32 mm. The forewings are dark brown, almost black, with four straw-yellow spots. Hindwings are orange yellow with a brown-black edge.

References

Arctiinae
Moths described in 1969
Moths of Madagascar
Moths of Africa